Joshua Thomas Bell (13 March 1863 – 10 March 1911) was an Australian barrister and politician.

Bell was the son of Sir Joshua Peter Bell, and his wife Margaret Miller, née Dorsey and was born in Ipswich, Queensland. Bell was educated at Brisbane Grammar School and University of Cambridge, where he became president of the union.

Bell was admitted to the English bar and was a marshal on the Northern Assizes circuit in 1888. In 1889 Bell returned to Australia and a year later became private secretary to Sir Samuel Griffith. In 1893 Bell was elected to the Legislative Assembly of Queensland for the electoral district of Dalby in which his family home, Jimbour Homestead, was located. He was to hold this seat for the rest of his life. Bell was elected chairman of committees in 1902 and in September 1903 joined the Arthur Morgan ministry as minister for lands. William Kidston succeeded Morgan in January 1906 but Bell held his old position in the new cabinet until November 1907, and was also minister for railways from February to July of that year. Bell was minister for lands in the second Kidston ministry from February to October 1908, and then home secretary until 29 June 1909, when he was elected speaker.

In 1901, Bell unsuccessfully contested the federal seat of Darling Downs in Australia's first federal by-election, but he was defeated by Littleton Ernest Groom, the son of the original member.

Bell died at Rakeevan, his Graceville residence on 10 March 1911 after a long illness. He had married in 1903 a daughter of John Ferguson, who survived him with a son and a daughter. Bell was accorded a state funeral which proceeded from St John's Anglican Cathedral to the Toowong Cemetery where he was buried next to his father.

References

Bibliography
 
 D. B. Waterson, 'Bell, Joshua Thomas (1863 - 1911)', Australian Dictionary of Biography, Volume 7, Melbourne University Press, 1979, p. 258. Retrieved 6 July 2009
 Bell, Joshua Thomas  — Brisbane City Council Grave Location Search

External links
 Joshua Thomas Bell entry on Jimbour History. Jimbour Homestead was the Bell family home for many years.

1863 births
1911 deaths
Members of the Queensland Legislative Assembly
Burials at Toowong Cemetery
Speakers of the Queensland Legislative Assembly
Australian people of Irish descent